David Greenblatt (May 16, 1938August 16, 2009) was a Canadian race car driver and builder of sports cars who was inducted into the Canadian Motorsport Hall of Fame in 1999.

He is the father of Melissa Richard-Greenblatt, Liane Greenblatt, and Samantha Burns. He is also the uncle of Simon Baron Cohen.

References

External links
 https://web.archive.org/web/20090502223005/http://www.cyberdabber.com/dailu/index.htm
 http://www.myspace.com/dailumk1
 http://www.conceptcarz.com/vehicle/z15049/Dailu-MKII.aspx
 https://web.archive.org/web/20090501082152/http://dailu.com/

Canadian racecar constructors
1938 births
2009 deaths